Horace Silver Trinder (29 August 1875 – 24 July 1956) was an Australian rules footballer who played with St Kilda in the Victorian Football League (VFL).

References

External links 

1875 births
1956 deaths
Australian rules footballers from Tasmania
St Kilda Football Club players